The following is a list of libraries in Tuvalu.

 Tuvalu National Library and Archives.
 University of the South Pacific Library, Tuvalu Campus.

References

 
Tuvalu
Libraries
Libraries